This is a list of the results of the 2021 Senedd election.

National results

Results by region

Summary

Mid and West Wales

North Wales

South Wales Central

South Wales East

South Wales West

Results by constituency 
Turnout percentages were also published by Wales Online.

New members 
20 of the members elected to the Senedd in the election were not members of the previous Senedd.

Constituency 

 James Evans, Conservatives, Brecon and Radnorshire
 Sarah Murphy, Labour, Bridgend
 Samuel Kurtz, Conservatives, Carmarthen West and South Pembrokeshire
 Mabon ap Gwynfor, Plaid Cymru, Dwyfor Meirionnydd
 Peter Fox, Conservatives, Monmouth
 Buffy Williams, Labour, Rhondda
 Gareth Davies, Conservatives, Vale of Clwyd

Regional 

 Cefin Campbell, Plaid Cymru, Mid and West Wales
 Jane Dodds, Liberal Democrats, Mid and West Wales
 Carolyn Thomas, Labour, North Wales
 Sam Rowlands, Conservatives, North Wales
 Rhys ab Owen, Plaid Cymru, South Wales Central
 Heledd Fychan, Plaid Cymru, South Wales Central
 Joel James, Conservatives, South Wales Central
 Peredur Owen Griffiths, Plaid Cymru, South Wales East
 Natasha Asghar, Conservatives, South Wales East
 Sioned Williams, Plaid Cymru, South Wales West
 Luke Fletcher, Plaid Cymru, South Wales West
 Tom Giffard, Conservatives, South Wales West
 Altaf Hussain, Conservatives, South Wales West

Incumbents defeated

Notes

References

General elections to the Senedd